Highland Creek is a subdivision located in Charlotte, North Carolina. The city of Concord completed the annexation of its portion of Highland Creek in June 2007.

Golf course

The development was built around an 18-hole championship golf course. Spread throughout the course are five lakes creating water features for 18 holes. The course was rated one of Charlotte's hardest in 2014.

Recreation and amenities
In addition to the 18-hole Highland Creek Golf Club, the subdivision includes the following amenities:

Five swimming pools:
Prosperity Park Pool
Christenbury Pool
Clarke Creek Pool
The Sports Club - 2 pools including water slides and a shallow "kiddie" pool

Highland Creek has six tennis courts:
Prosperity Park Tennis Courts (4)
Clarke Creek Tennis Courts (2)

The Sports Club has a Fitness Center and community gathering area that is used for such occasions as receptions, martial arts instruction and massages. The Sports Club Fitness Center now has five new Life Fitness treadmills, three ellipticals and two new rowing ergometers.  There are several basketball and volleyball courts in the neighborhood and a park that is used for outdoor movies in the spring and summer.

Highland Creek employs a private security firm and off-duty police officers to patrol the subdivision.

Education

According to its website, Highland Creek Elementary School houses 1,154 students in grades K-5 with a before and after school program to provide care for the Highland Creek community.  The facility which includes  provides students with 39 classrooms, several learning cottages, a state of the art media center and computer lab, with an art room with a kiln and a music room. In 2012, Highland Creek Elementary school was named a school of excellence - placing it in the top 1% of elementary schools in the state of North Carolina. 

Mallard Creek High School, located at 3825 Johnston Oehler Rd. Charlotte, serves the Highland Creek area. The school opened in the 2007-2008 school year. It houses about 2000 students.  Built with a budget of nearly 60 million dollars, the school has state-of-the-art educational and athletic amenities.

Cox Mill High School services kids who live in the Cabarrus County portion of Highland Creek.  It was opened in the 2009-2010 school year.

In Summer, 2009, Ridge Road Middle School opened to hundreds of students. The school was constructed adjacent to the elementary school. The construction costs totaled around $15.4 million. The two-story school has 54 classrooms and spans .

Surrounding area
Highland Creek is in a section of Charlotte called the "University Area." Many university employees live in Highland Creek. The UNC Charlotte campus is the fourth largest campus in the Carolina system with over 21,500 students.

North Carolina's number one tourist attraction, Concord Mills Mall is just  from Highland Creek.

Uptown Charlotte is about a 25-minute drive South from Highland Creek. Many residents commute South to work at such businesses as Duke Energy and Bank of America each of which is headquartered in Charlotte. Wells Fargo, which purchased Wachovia in 2008, remains one of the city's largest employers. The local area is also home to the Southern campus of TIAA CREF.

The Appalachian Mountains are about a two-hour drive West, Myrtle Beach, about four hours Southeast.

Transportation
Highland Creek lies between two major interstate highways, I-85 and I-77. It is also located just outside the 485 loop, which circles Charlotte and connects to both I-85 and I-77. 

The community is located just west of Concord Regional Airport, with a  runway.  It is also convenient to Charlotte/Douglas International Airport, with service by many major domestic and international airlines.

References

External links
Highland Creek's Official Web Site

Neighborhoods in Charlotte, North Carolina
Concord, North Carolina
Charlotte metropolitan area
Geography of Cabarrus County, North Carolina